Christian Haller Lindsay (July 24, 1878 – January 25, 1941), nicknamed "Pinky" and "The Crab", was a first baseman in Major League Baseball who played in  and  for the Detroit Tigers. He was born in Moon Township, Pennsylvania.
 
In two-season career, Lindsay was a .242 hitter (200-for-828) with 97 runs and 64 RBI in 229 games, including 30 doubles, three triples, and 28 stolen bases without home runs.

Lindsay died at the age of 62 in Cleveland, Ohio.

External links

Biography

1878 births
1941 deaths
Major League Baseball first basemen
Detroit Tigers players
Indianapolis Indians players
Kansas City Blues (baseball) players
Denver Grizzlies (baseball) players
Baseball players from Pennsylvania